William Granara is an American author, translator and scholar  of Arabic language and literature. He studied at Georgetown University and the University of Pennsylvania, obtaining his PhD from the latter in Arabic and Islamic studies. He has worked for the American University in Cairo and for the US State Department in Tunis. He is currently director of the Arabic language program at Harvard University.

Granara is an expert on the history of Muslim Sicily, and on the Sicilian Arab poet Ibn Hamdis. He has also contributed to a volume entitled The Architecture and Memory of the Minority Quarter in the Muslim Mediterranean City.  Among his translations are:
 The Earthquake by Tahir Wattar
 Granada by Radwa Ashour
 The Battle of Poitiers by Jurji Zaydan

Granara's work has appeared in Banipal magazine.

Granara is a member of the board of trustees at The American College of the Mediterranean (ACM), an American-style degree-granting institution in Aix-en-Provence, France which includes a study abroad institute for American undergraduate students, IAU College.

See also
 List of Arabic-English translators

References

Georgetown University alumni
University of Pennsylvania alumni
Academic staff of The American University in Cairo
Harvard University faculty
American translators
Arabic–English translators
American Arabists
American expatriates in Egypt
Year of birth missing (living people)
Living people
Place of birth missing (living people)